Htigyaing, also spelt Tigyaing, is a town in eastern Sagaing Division, in northern Myanmar. It is a port on the Irrawaddy River and the administrative seat of Tigyaing Township.

History
When the Mongols first invaded Burma in 1277, the excessive heat forced them to turn back at Htigyaing which was later taken along with Tagaung in 1283 eventually leading to the fall of the kingdom of Bagan. The Saopha of Wuntho rose up in rebellion in 1891 and attacked Kawlin forcing the British to fall back on Htigyaing.

Transport and economy
Katha – Htigyaing section of the Shwebo – Myitkyina road has been shortened in recent years from 58 miles to just over 26 miles by Mezar Bridge linking Htigyaing with Indaw. Rice paddies, rubber and teak plantations constitute the main agricultural activities in the area.

Notes

External links
Satellite map: Tigyaing GeoNames
 "Tigyaing, Burma" Falling Rain Genomics, Inc.
 "Tigyaing Map – Satellite Images of Tigyaing" Maplandia.com

Township capitals of Myanmar
Populated places in Sagaing Region